Egoitz Magdaleno de la Iglesia (born 4 April 1991) is a Spanish professional footballer60°. Mainly a defensive midfielder, he can also play as a left back.

Club career
Born in Bilbao, Biscay, Basque Country, Magdaleno was a Danok Bat CF youth graduate. He made his senior debuts with Zalla UC in 2010, in Tercera División.

In June 2011 Magdaleno moved to Athletic Bilbao, club he already represented as a youth, and was assigned to the farm team also in the fourth tier. On 30 May of the following year he was promoted to the reserves in Segunda División B.

On 3 May 2015, during a 0–1 loss at CF Fuenlabrada, Magdaleno suffered a serious knee injury which ruled him out of the promotion play-offs to Segunda División. He only returned to action in February 2016, appearing in a 1–2 Premier League International Cup loss against Villarreal CF.

Magdaleno made his professional debut on 4 June 2016, coming on as a late substitute for Unai Bilbao in a 2–0 home win against CD Tenerife for the second level championship; his side, however, was already relegated. Three days later, he was released by the Lions.

On 18 July 2016, Magdaleno signed for Sestao River in the third level.

References

External links

1991 births
Living people
Footballers from Bilbao
Spanish footballers
Association football defenders
Association football midfielders
Segunda División players
Segunda División B players
Tercera División players
Zalla UC footballers
CD Basconia footballers
Bilbao Athletic footballers
Sestao River footballers
SD Leioa players
CD El Ejido players
Danok Bat CF players
Athletic Bilbao footballers